Guillem de l'Olivier d'Arle, also spelled Guilhem del Olivier, was a troubadour, probably active after 1260. He was from Provence, presumably the region around Arles, and he was also active in northern Italy. He was a prolific author of coblas esparsas, single-stanza poems, usually on a moral theme. The number of lines per poem vary from a low of four to a high of sixteen. Scholars Alfred Pillet and Henry Carstens, along with István Frank, counted 77 such pieces; while Oskar Schultz-Gora counted 79, and Alfred Jeanroy only 70.

A poem ascribed to a "Sir [En] G. de Lobeuier" in one chansonnier is commonly thought to belong to Guillem de l'Olivier, and some manuscripts also mistakenly call him "Gui" or "Guiraut". The unreliable Jean de Nostredame  identified him with a certain Uc de Lobevier (Hugues de Lobières).

Coblas esparsas

Editions
Schultz-Gora, Oskar, ed. "Die 'coblas triadas' des Guilhem de l'Olivier d'Arle". Provenzalische Studien, I. Schriften der Wissenschaftlichen Gesellschaft in Straßburg, 37. Strasbourg: Karl J. Trübner, 1919 : 24–82.

External links
Complete works at trobar.org

13th-century French troubadours
People from Arles